{{DISPLAYTITLE:C4F6}}
The molecular formula C4F6 (molar mass: 162.0 g/mol, exact mass: 161.9904 u) may refer to:

 Hexafluorobutadiene
 Hexafluorocyclobutene
 Hexafluoro-2-butyne

Molecular formulas